Zsuzsanna Gulácsi (born on 10 April 1966) is a Hungarian-born American historian, art historian of pan-Asiatic religions. She is a professor of art history, Asian studies, and comparative religious studies at Northern Arizona University (NAU). Her teaching covers Early and Eastern Christian (Syriac and Armenian) art, Islamic art, with special attention to the medium of the illuminated book; as well as late ancient and mediaeval Buddhist art from South, Central, and East Asia.

She is a specialist of Manichaean art, in addition, her research also focuses on the artistic heritage of other Silk Road religions such as Buddhism and East Syriac Christianity, with special attention to Manichaeism.

Career 
Gulácsi went to the United States in 1990 in pursuit of a postgraduate education in Central Eurasian Studies and Art History and studied at Indiana University Bloomington. She received a double major PhD degree in 1998. From 1999 to 2003, she taught history of Central Asian art at Sophia University in Tokyo, Japan. Then she joined the faculty of the Department of Humanities, Arts, and Religion at NAU in 2003. She has also published a number of articles and books. She was awarded the Guggenheim Fellowship for Humanities in 2016. In 2017, she was invited by Frantz Grenet as a guest lecturer at Collège de France.

Awards 
 Guggenheim Fellowship for Humanities
 Ryskamp Research Fellows
 American Philosophical Society, Franklin Research Grant
 Northern Arizona University (3 Intramural Grants)
 Japanese Cultural Ministry, "Young Scholar" Fellow (Japan)
 Outstanding Teacher and Scholar, Indiana University

Selected publications 
 Manichaean Art in Berlin Collections, "Corpus Fontium Manichaeorum: Series Archaeologica et Iconographica". Turnhout: Brepols Publishers, 2001
 Mediaeval Manichaean Book Art: A Codicological Study of Iranian and Turkic Illuminated Book Fragments from 8th-11th Century East Central Asia, "Nag Hammadi and Manichaean Studies" series. Leiden: Brill Publishers, 2005
 Mani's Pictures: The Didactic Images of the Manichaeans from Sasanian Mesopotamia to Uygur Central Asia and Tang-Ming China, "Nag Hammadi and Manichaean Studies" series. Leiden: Brill Publishers, 2015

See also 
 Manichaean Diagram of the Universe
 Manichaean Painting of the Buddha Jesus
 Sermon on Mani's Teaching of Salvation

References 

1966 births
Living people
Hungarian art historians
Women art historians
Historians of East Asian art
Indiana University Bloomington alumni
Northern Arizona University faculty